Kauai County (officially known as the County of Kauai) is a county in the U.S. state of Hawaii. It consists of the islands of Kauai, Niihau, Lehua, and Kaula. As of the 2020 Census the population was 73,298. The county seat is Līhue.

The Kapa'a Micropolitan Statistical Area includes all of Kauai County.

Geography
The Pacific Ocean surrounds the county.

Adjacent entities
Honolulu County, Hawaii - southeast
Midway Atoll - northwest

National protected areas
 Hanalei National Wildlife Refuge
 Huleia National Wildlife Refuge
 Kilauea Point National Wildlife Refuge

Government and politics
Kauai County has a mayor-council form of municipal government. Executive authority is vested in the Mayor of Kauai, elected by the voters on a nonpartisan basis to a four-year term. Legislative authority is vested in the seven-member County Council. All members of the County Council are elected on a nonpartisan, at-large basis to two-year terms.

United States Congress
Kauai County, like the rest of Hawaii, is represented entirely by Democrats in both the United States Senate and the United States House of Representatives.

Hawaii Legislature

Hawaii Senate

Hawaii House of Representatives

Elections

Federal
Kauai County has traditionally been a solid Democratic stronghold. The county has not voted Republican since the 1984 federal election, when it narrowly voted in favor of Ronald Reagan.

Demographics

At the 2000 census there were 58,463 people, 20,183 households, and 14,572 families in the county. The population density was 94 people per square mile (36/km2). There were 25,331 housing units at an average density of 41 per square mile (16/km2).  The racial makeup of the county was 36.0% Asian, 29.5% White, 23.8% from two or more races, 9.1% Pacific Islander, 0.3% Black or African American, 0.4% Native American and 0.9% from other races. 8.2%. were Hispanic or Latino of any race.

Of the 20,183 households 34.0% had children under the age of 18 living with them, 53.9% were married couples living together, 12.8% had a female householder with no husband present, and 27.8% were non-families. 21.4% of households were one person and 7.7% were one person aged 65 or older. The average household size was 2.87 and the average family size was 3.34.

The age distribution was 26.4% under the age of 18, 7.1% from 18 to 24, 27.2% from 25 to 44, 25.5% from 45 to 64, and 13.8% 65 or older. The median age was 38 years. For every 100 females there were 100.10 males. For every 100 females age 18 and over, there were 97.50 males.

Economy

Top employers
According to the county's 2019 Comprehensive Annual Financial Report, the top non-government employers in the county are:

Education

Higher education

Kauai Community College is the county's only institution of higher education. One of the ten branches of the University of Hawaiʻi system, it offers a range of 2-year degrees and is accredited by the Western Association of Schools and Colleges.

Primary and Secondary Education
Public schools in the county are operated by the Hawaiʻi State Department of Education, and the county is represented by Maggie Cox on the state's Board of Education. There are 10 elementary schools, 3 middle schools, 3 high schools, and 5 K-12 schools in the county.

High schools
 Kapa'a High School
 Kauaʻi High School
 Waimea High School

Middle schools
 Chiefess Kamakahelei Middle School
 Kapa'a Middle School
 Waimea Canyon Middle School

Elementary schools
 Alakaʻi O Kauaʻi Public Charter School
 Eleele Elementary School
 Hanalei Elementary School
 Kalaheo Elementary School
 Kapa'a Elementary
 Kaumualii Elementary School
 Kekaha Elementary School
 Kilauea Elementary School
 Kōloa Elementary School
 Wilcox Elementary School

K-12 Schools
 Kanuikapono Public Charter School
 Kawaikini New Century Public Charter School
  Ke Kula Niʻihau O Kekaha Learning Center
 Kula Aupuni Niʻihau A Kahelelani Aloha
 Ni'ihau High & Elementary

Private schools
There are two private schools in the county: Island School, and the Kahili Adventist School.
Four private schools, including St. Catherine's School and St. Theresa's Elementary School (Catholic schools)
and the Charter Schools on the island...

Infrastructure

Transportation
Lihue Airport serves the island of Kauai. Bus service is provided by The Kauai Bus.

Major Highways

Communities
There are no incorporated communities in Kauai County, or in any other county of Hawaii. The county is the only form of local government in the State of Hawaii.

Census-designated places

Anahola
Eleele
Haena
Hanalei
Hanamaulu
Hanapepe
Kalaheo
Kalihiwai
Kapa'a
Kaumakani
Kekaha
Kilauea
Koloa
Lawai
Lihue
Omao
Pakala Village
Poipu
Princeville
Puhi
Wailua
Wailuā Homesteads
Waimea
Wainiha

Other unincorporated places
Puuwai
Kealia

Sister cities
Kauai County's sister cities are:

 Bangued, Philippines
 Davao City, Philippines
 Ishigaki, Japan
 Iwaki, Japan
 Laoag, Philippines
 Moriyama, Japan
 Papenoo, French Polynesia
 Santa, Philippines
 Suō-Ōshima, Japan
 Urdaneta, Philippines
 Whitby, England, United Kingdom

References

 
Hawaii counties
1905 establishments in Hawaii
Populated places established in 1905